"Robin Adair" is a traditional Irish (sometimes identified as Scottish) song with lyrics written by Lady Caroline Keppel. It was popular in the 18th century. It has a Roud Folk Song Index number of 8918. The song was mentioned by Jane Austen in her 1815 novel Emma; the character Jane Fairfax played it on the piano.  The song is also mentioned in Chapter IX of MacKinlay Kantor's Pulitzer Prize-winning novel "Andersonville" (1955).

Background

Robert "Robin" Adair was a real person: a surgeon-colonel in the British army, who declined a baronetcy, he was born in Dublin around 1714 and died in 1790. Lady Caroline Keppel (c. 1734–1769), the elder of the two daughters of Willem Anne van Keppel, 2nd Earl of Albemarle, married Adair, despite the fact that her family disapproved of the match because of his lower status. Lady Caroline wrote the song bearing her husband's name during the 1750s as a rebuke to her family for what she perceived as their snobbery regarding her handsome and accomplished lover. Their son, also christened Robert Adair, became an MP and went on to become a distinguished British diplomat, frequently employed on the most important diplomatic missions. The tune to which Lady Caroline's verse was set may have been written by Charles Coffey ("Eileen Aroon," a work by him, features the same melody).

Lyrics

These lyrics were printed in a chapbook of 1823:

A further three verses may comprise a later addition.

External links

Robin Adair, London: G. Walker, [1804-1814] on Internet Archive

Interpretations

  performed by Samantha Carrasco, piano

References

Traditional ballads
Irish folk songs